West Liss is the oldest part of the modern village of Liss, in Hampshire, England. It has two pubs, called The Spread Eagle and The Blue Bell, although the Blue Bell is currently shut and expected to be converted into housing or torn down and new buildings put in its place.

The Liss Cricket Club is also based in West Liss. It has a picturesque ground with a quirky fixture of a short boundary due to a large over-hanging oak tree.  St Mary's Church stands in West Liss and was designed by Sir Arthur Blomfield and consecrated 1892. The composer Michael Hurd lived at 4, Church Street from 1961 until his death in 2006.

References

External links

Villages in Hampshire